The Flinders Highway is a highway that crosses Queensland east to west, from Townsville on the Pacific coast to Cloncurry. The road continues as the Barkly Highway from Cloncurry to the Northern Territory border at Camooweal and beyond. The Flinders Highway passes a number of small outback towns and typical outback landscape predominates towards the inland. It was known as National Route 78 before Queensland began to convert to the alphanumeric system being adopted in Australia and is now designated as A6. The highway is also known as Overlanders Way. Its entire length is part of the National Land Transport Network (formerly Auslink).

As at 1957, only the Townsville to Charters Towers section was sealed. The rest of the highway was progressively sealed with the last section completed in November 1976.

Northern Australia Roads Program upgrades
The Northern Australia Roads Program announced in 2016 included two projects for the Flinders Highway.

Pavement strengthening
The project for pavement strengthening and rehabilitation between Townsville and Torrens Creek was expected to finish in late 2021 at a total cost of $22.2 million.

Replacement of culverts
The project for replacement of culverts between Charters Towers and Richmond was completed in late 2018 at a total cost of $15.1 million.

Roads of Strategic Importance upgrades
The Roads of Strategic Importance initiative, last updated in March 2022, includes the following projects for the Flinders Highway.

Corridor upgrade
A lead project to upgrade the Queensland section of the Tennant Creek to Townsville corridor, including sections of the Barkly and Flinders Highways, the Kennedy Developmental Road and surrounding state and council roads, at an estimated cost of $250 million, was in the planning stage in 2020.

Overtaking lanes
A project to construct overtaking lanes between Townsville and Charters Towers at a cost of $33.4 million is planned to be completed by mid-2023. This project is targeted for "early works" by the Queensland Government, and has been split into two packages.

Pavement strengthening and widening
A project to strengthen and widen the pavement at Scrubby Creek, between Julia Creek and Cloncurry, at a cost of $32.6 million is due for completion in early 2024. This project is targeted for "early works" by the Queensland Government.

Wide centre line treatment
A project to deliver wide centre lines on a section of road between Townsville and Charters Towers at a cost of $9.7 million was due for completion in early 2022. This project was targeted for "early works" by the Queensland Government, and was split into two packages.

Other upgrades

Construct acceleration lane
A project to construct an acceleration lane at Woodstock, at a cost of $5 million, was completed in December 2020.

Towns

Charters Towers
Charters Towers, 133 km to the south west from Townsville. A former gold rush town with a population of 30 000 in 1890. At that time it was known as "The World" because it seemed to be the centre of everything. Presently it is a centre for cattle grazing, with gold mining continuing to be an important industry. Much of the elegant gold rush architecture of the nineteenth century remains in place and is a tourist attraction.

Pentland
Pentland is located between Charters Towers and Hughenden. Hughenden has about 2000 people and Charters Towers has about 9000. Pentland's population is estimated to be 250 people.

Hughenden
Located 243 km further on, Hughenden, the administrative centre of Flinders shire is in the heart of sheep and cattle country.

Richmond
Richmond, a former gold rush town located 112 km further west. Currently a pastoral centre.

Julia Creek
Julia Creek, 147 km further west, another pastoral settlement

Cloncurry
Cloncurry, former copper-mining town located 139 km west from Julia Creek. The first regular Qantas flights started between here and Charleville in 1922 and Royal Flying Doctor Service of Australia service started here in 1928. Nowadays it is an important road and rail junction. Flinders Highway ends here.

Major intersections

See also 

 Highways in Australia
 List of highways in Queensland

References

External links 
 Overlander's Highway A driving guide by Roderick Eime

Highways in Queensland
North West Queensland